Clive Griffiths may refer to:

 Clive Griffiths (politician) (born 1928), Western Australian politician
 Clive Griffiths (rugby) (born 1954), Welsh dual-code rugby footballer and coach
 Clive Griffiths (footballer) (1955–2022), played in the North American Soccer League
 Clive Griffiths, bass guitar player, member of the Four Bucketeers